Bordaia pica is a species of moth of the family Hepialidae. It is endemic to South Australia, Victoria and Western Australia.

References

External links
Hepialidae genera

Moths described in 1932
Hepialidae